The Lewis and Clark Hotel in Mandan, North Dakota was built in 1918.
It was listed on the National Register of Historic Places in 1983.

History

The building was built by Louis B. Hanna (1861–1948) who served as Governor of North Dakota (1913–1917).  In 1916, he purchased and razed the Inter-Ocean Hotel in downtown Mandan  and  drew up plans for a  new hotel building. The building was designed by Fargo-based architect William J. Gage (1891-1965).

The four story high building is constructed of pressed brick, with white enamel ornamental trimmings. The structure was built as a 120-room hotel with commercial space. Hotel rooms occupy the second, third, and fourth floors of the building. Merchant's National Bank was located in the southeast corner of the building when the hotel first opened.

References

External links
Lewis and Clark Hotel Hotel guide

Hotel buildings on the National Register of Historic Places in North Dakota
Hotel buildings completed in 1918
Mandan, North Dakota
National Register of Historic Places in Morton County, North Dakota
Individually listed contributing properties to historic districts on the National Register in North Dakota
1918 establishments in North Dakota